The Chavez Ravine Arboretum, in Elysian Park, just north of Dodger Stadium, at 929 Academy Road, Los Angeles, California, contains more than 100 varieties of trees from around the world, including what are believed to be the oldest and largest Cape Chestnut, Kauri, and Tipu trees in the United States. Admission to the arboretum is free.

The Arboretum was founded in 1893 by the Los Angeles Horticultural Society, and planting of rare trees continued through the 1920s. Most of the original trees are still standing. The Arboretum was declared a Los Angeles Historic-Cultural Monument in 1967.

Trees in the Arboretum include:
Acacia dealbata
Acer (maple)
Acer campestre (field maple)
Acer negundo (box elder)
Acer paxii
Acer saccharinum (silver maple)
Aesculus x carnea
Afrocarpus gracilior
Agathis robusta
Alnus rhombifolia (white alder)
Angophora costata (rose apple)
Araucaria bidwillii (bunya pine)
Archontophoenix cunninghamiana (king palm)
Baphia chrysophylla
Bauhinia
Bauhinia forficata (Brazilian orchid tree)
Bauhinia variegata (orchid tree)
Betula nigra (black birch)
Brachychiton (bottletree)
Brachychiton acerifolius (Illiwarra flame tree)
Brachychiton acerifolius (Herman hybrid)
Brachychiton discolor
Brachychiton populneus (Kurrajong)
Brahea (Hesper palm)
Brahea armata (Mexican blue palm)
Brahea brandegeei
Brahea edulis (Guadalupe palm)
Butia capitata (jelly palm)
Calocedrus decurrens (California incense cedar)
Calodendrum capense (Cape chestnut)
Caryota urens
Castanospermum australe
Casuarina cunninghamiana
Cedrus (cedar)
Cedrus deodara
Cedrus libani
Ceiba (cypress)
Ceiba insignis
Ceiba speciosa (silk floss tree)
Celtis australis
Chamaerops humilis
Chionanthus retusus
Cryptocarya rubra
Cryptomeria japonica
Cupaniopsis anacardioides
Cupressus
Cupressus glabra
Cupressus species
Dalbergia sissoo
Dracaena draco (Canary Islands dragon tree)
Ehretia
Ehretia anacua (sandpaper tree)
Ehretia tinifolia
Eriobotrya
Eriobotrya deflexa
Eriobotrya japonica (loquat)
Erythrina (coral tree)
Erythrina coralloides (naked coral tree)
Erythrina falcata (Brazilian coral tree)
Erythrina humeana (dwarf kaffirboom)
Eucalyptus
Eucalyptus camaldulensis (river red gum)
Eucalyptus citriodora
Eucalyptus cladocalyx (sugar gum)
Eucalyptus globulus
Eucalyptus robusta (swamp mahogany)
Eucalyptus rudis (flooded gum)
Eucalyptus viminalis (manna gum)
Ficus (fig tree)
Ficus microcarpa
Ficus racemosa
Ficus religiosa (sacred fig)
Ficus species
Fraxinus (ash)
Fraxinus uhdei
Fraxinus velutina
Handroanthus impetiginosus (pink lapacho)
Heteromeles arbutifolia
Jacaranda acutifolia
Jubaea chilensis (Chilean wine palm)
Juglans nigra (eastern black walnut)
Lagerstroemia indica (crepe myrtle)
Liquidambar formosana (Chinese sweet gum)
Liriodendron tulipifera
Livistona
Livistona australis (cabbage-tree palm)
Livistona chinensis (Chinese fan palm)
Macadamia ternifolia
Magnolia grandiflora
Metasequoia glyptostroboides (dawn redwood)
Metrosideros excelsa (pohutukawa)
Nyssa sylvatica (black tupelo)
Phoenix
Phoenix canariensis (Canary Island date palm)
Phoenix dactylifera (date palm)
Phoenix reclinata
Phoenix reclinata (hybrid)
Phoenix roebelenii x rupicola
Phoenix rupicola (cliff date palm)
Phytolacca dioica (ombú)
Pinus (pine)
Pinus canariensis (Canary Island pine)
Pinus edulis (Colorado pinyon)
Pinus halepensis (aleppo pine)
Pinus thunbergii (Japanese black pine)
Pittosporum (cheesewood)
Pittosporum phillyraeoides
Pittosporum tenuifolium (black matipo)
Pittosporum undulatum
Plinia cauliflora (jabuticaba)
Podocarpus totara
Psidium guajava (apple guava)
Quercus (oak)
Quercus agrifolia (coast live oak)
Quercus alba (white oak)
Quercus cerris (turkey oak)
Quercus coccinea (scarlet oak)
Quercus macrocarpa (bur oak)
Quercus palustris (pin oak)
Quercus rubra (northern red oak)
Quercus suber (cork oak)
Quercus virginiana (southern live oak)
Rhapidophyllym hystrix (needle palm)
Rhapis excelsa (broadleaf lady palm)
Rhodosphaera rhodanthema
Rhopalostylis baueri
Rhus integrifolia
Sabal
Sabal causiarum (Puerto Rican hat palm)
Sabal species
Salix babylonica (weeping willow)
Schinus (pepper tree)
Schinus molle (Peruvian pepper)
Schinus polygamus (Cabrera Hardee peppertree)
Sequoiadendron giganteum
Syagrus romanzoffiana (queen palm)
Taxodium distichum
Tipuana tipu
Toona ciliata
Trachycarpus
Trachycarpus fortunei (windmill palm)
Trachycarpus wagnerianus
Tristaniopsis laurina (water gum)
Trithrinax acanthocoma
Ulmus americana (American elm)
Umbellularia californica (California bay laurel)
Washingtonia
Washingtonia filifera (desert fan)
Washingtonia robusta (Mexican fan palm)
Zelkova serrata (Japanese zelkova)

See also
 List of botanical gardens in the United States

External links
 City of Los Angeles: official Chavez Arboretum website

Arboreta in California
Elysian Park, Los Angeles
Parks in Los Angeles
Los Angeles Historic-Cultural Monuments
Los Angeles-related lists
Lists of flora of California
1893 establishments in California
19th century in Los Angeles